Robbins Entertainment is an American dance music record label. It is owned by Cory Robbins and has released music by Cascada, such as their hit single "Everytime We Touch". It is also the company responsible for the Dance Party Like It's.... series and the Trance Party series, as well as the Mixshow series. Several one-volume CDs like Dance Rock have also been released. The label is distributed by The Orchard and is one of two labels in the Sony Music line-up that specializes in dance and electronic music, the other being Ultra Music (which Sony acquired in 2013 in an investment deal), who has collaborated with Robbins on several occasions. Robbins Entertainment has a country music division named Robbins Nashville, which was created in May 2007.

History
Robbins Entertainment was founded in 1996 by Cory Robbins, co-founder of Profile Records.  This new record label was based out of New York City.  Most of the artists signed to the label are successful overseas and European acts. American acts like Rockell and Reina, however, had Billboard Hot 100 hits. Spanish DJ Sammy gave Robbins its first top 10 Hot 100 hit in 2002 with "Heaven" which featured Dutch recording artist Do. The Belgian group D.H.T.'s 'Listen To Your Heart' also made #8 on the U.S. charts, and #1 on Pop Airplay. Two other Belgian acts - Ian Van Dahl ("Castles in the Sky") and Lasgo ("Something" & "Alone") also made the U.S. Billboard charts. Robbins was able to attract further foreign talent as Germany's Cascada following this, which helped the company gain more success when Everytime We Touch, What Hurts the Most, and most recently Evacuate the Dancefloor became mainstream pop hits as well.

Roster
The following is a list of notable artists signed currently (or previously) under Robbins Entertainment.

Artists
Afrojack
 Ahmir
Akcent
AnnaGrace
 Ameerah
 A-Minor
 Aurora
 Bastien Laval
 Borgore
 Carnage
 Criminal Vibes
 Jenny Bliss
 Cascada
 Daisy
 Dana Rayne
 Daniela
 Darude
 De Lorean
 D.H.T.
 Disconfect
 Dimitri Vegas & Like Mike
 DJ Sammy
 Jenna Drey
 Edun
 Elena
 Emilia De Poret
 Erotico
 Gaia & Luna
 Game Related
 Heather Leigh West
 Ian Van Dahl
 Jaylyn Ducati
 Joey Moe
 Lauren Dyson
 Lasgo
 Loren Reed
 Kate Ryan
 Kim Leoni
 Master Blaster
 Mia J
 Milky
 Negin
 Niamh Egan
 Penny Foster
 Rabeez
 Reina
 Rockell
 Ronny V. featuring Nanda
 Route Too Far
 RUNAGROUND
 Santito vs. Block & Crown
 September
 Shermanology
 Martijn Ten Velden
 Tess
 Judy Torres
 Tom Hangs
 The Touch
 Undercover Divas
 U.V.U.K.
 Vato Gonzalez
 West Coast Massive
 Wendel Kos
 Velvet
 Yolanda Be Cool

Albums
Ace by Ian Van Dahl
Everytime We Touch by Cascada
Far Away by Lasgo
Heaven by DJ Sammy
Listen To Your Heart by D.H.T.
Lost & Found by Ian Van Dahl
Perfect Day by Cascada
September by September
Some Things by Lasgo
This Is Reina by Reina
Evacuate the Dancefloor by Cascada
Love CPR by September

See also 
 List of record labels

References

External links 
 Robbins Entertainment (Official Site)

 
American independent record labels
Electronic dance music record labels
Record labels established in 1996
Sony Music